Puerto Rican singer Farruko has released six studio albums, 53 singles, one mixtape, and five compilation albums. Collaborations are also included.

Farruko has sung reggaeton, merengue, bachata, pop, Latin dance, Latin trap, and reggae. He has collaborated with artists such as Pitbull, Daddy Yankee, Arcángel, Ñengo Flow, Bad Bunny and Yandel.

Farruko released his first song "Sexo Fuera Del Planeta" in 2009 through the Internet and gained fame in Puerto Rico. Farruko released his first album El Talento Del Bloque which produced hit singles, "Su Hija Me Gusta" featuring José Feliciano, "Nena Fichu", and "Te Iré a Buscar". His second album, released in 2012, featured collaborations with Puerto Rican superstar Daddy Yankee, and Cuban star Micha. The album spawned six singles but only three of them were international hits: "Va a Ser Abuela", "Feel the Rhythm", and "Titerito". He was invited to Sábado Gigante, and Esta Noche Tu Night to perform the hit single "Feel the Rhythm". The album was nominated for the Latin Grammy Award for Best Urban Music Album in 2012. Farruko's third album Imperio Nazza: Farruko Edition, was a better album with Daddy Yankee collaborating with Farruko once again, J Alvarez also featured on the album along with Arcángel, De La Ghetto, Reykon, and Zion & Lennox. The album received high ratings, and it was a fan favorite album. The smash hit was "Besas Tan Bien" and "Mi Vida No Va a Cambiar" alongside Arcángel which was not a single on the album. "Voy a 100" was also a number one hit in Latin America.

Studio albums

Singles

As lead artist

As featured artist

Other charted and certified songs

Guest appearances

References

Discographies of Puerto Rican artists
Reggaeton discographies